The Wik Paach or Wikapatja were an indigenous Australian people of the Cape York Peninsula of northern Queensland.

Language
The Wikapatja spoke Wik Paach, which despite the name, is not one of the Wik languages.

Country
The Wikapatja were a small tribe whose territory, estimated by Tindale as not exceeding , was limited to the mangroves around the delta of the Archer River.

People
The tribe was deemed to be extinct by the time of Tindale's writing in 1974.

Notes

Citations

Sources

Aboriginal peoples of Queensland